The 2005 Asian Youth Girls Volleyball Championship was held in Mandaue Sports Complex, Mandaue City, Philippines from 24 to 31 May 2005.

Teams
The teams are seeded based on their final ranking at the 2003 Asian Youth Girls Volleyball Championship.

Preliminary round

Pool A

|}

|}

Pool B

|}

|}

Final round

Quarterfinals

|}

5th–8th semifinals

|}

Semifinals

|}

7th place

|}

5th place

|}

3rd place

|}

Final

|}

Final standing

Awards
MVP:
Best Scorer: 
Best Spiker: 
Best Blocker: 
Best Server: 
Best Setter: 
Best Receiver: 
Best Libero:

References
 www.asianvolleyball.org

External links
FIVB

A
V
V
Asian women's volleyball championships
Sports in Cebu